The Hochlantsch is the highest mountain in the Graz Highlands, a subgroup of the Prealps East of the Mur according to the Alpine Club classification of the Eastern Alps. To the north the mountain drops steeply into the Lantschmauern. The Hochlantsch is a popular destination for those living in the Graz area due to its good views and easy access.

The easiest ascent takes about two hours and starts at the Teichalm. One can either start at the Teichwirt or a few metres on at where the Teichalm Lift. Another variant from Mixnitz runs through the watery Bärenschütz Gorge. From the pub of Zirbisegger (accessible from Breitenau by car) the Friends of Nature Klettersteig (Naturfreunde-Klettersteig) runs up the rocky northern flank to the top. Nearby are the inn of zum Steirischen Jokl and the little pilgrimage church of Schüsserlbrunn.

External links 

 Route description of the Friends of Nature Klettersteig at www.bergsteigen.com (retrieved 15 December 2012)
 Tour description in Der Standard newspaper

Mountains of the Alps
Mountains of Styria
Graz Highlands